Calvin Harris is a Scottish musician, record producer, DJ, singer, and songwriter.

American Music Awards

!
|-
|2012
|rowspan="6"|Calvin Harris
|rowspan="6"|Favorite EDM Artist
|
|
|-
|2013
|
|
|-
|2014
|
|
|-
|2015
|
|
|-
|2016
|
|
|-
|2017
|
|
|}

APRA Music Awards

ASCAP Pop Music Awards

|-
|rowspan="4"|2013
|"We Found Love" (with Rihanna)
|rowspan="4"|Most Performed Songs
|
|-
|"Let's Go" (featuring Ne-Yo)
|
|-
|"Where Have You Been"
|
|-
|"Feel So Close"
|
|-
|}

BBC Music Awards

|-
|2017
|Funk Wav Bounces Vol. 1
|British Album of the Year
|
|-
|}

Billboard Music Awards

|-
|2012
|"We Found Love" (with Rihanna)
|Top Radio Song
|
|-
|rowspan="4"|2013
|"Sweet Nothing" (featuring Florence Welch)
|rowspan="2"|Top EDM Song
|
|-
|"Feel So Close"
|
|-
|rowspan="4"|Calvin Harris
|Top Dance Artist
|
|-
|Top EDM Artist
|
|-
|2014
|rowspan="2"|Top Dance/Electronic Artist
|
|-
|rowspan="3"|2015
|
|-
|"Summer"
|Top Dance/Electronic Song
| rowspan="2" 
|-
|Motion
|Top Dance/Electronic Album
|-
|rowspan=2|2017
|Calvin Harris
|Top Dance/Electronic Artist
|
|-
|"This Is What You Came For" (with Rihanna)
|Top Dance/Electronic Song
|
|-
|rowspan=2|2018
|Calvin Harris
|Top Dance/Electronic Artist
|
|-
|Funk Wav Bounces Vol. 1
|Top Dance/Electronic Album
|
|-
|rowspan=2|2019
|Calvin Harris
|Top Dance/Electronic Artist
|
|-
|"One Kiss" (with Dua Lipa)
|Top Dance/Electronic Song
|
|}

Billboard Latin Music Awards

|-
|2017
|Calvin Harris
|Crossover Artist of the Year
|
|-
|}

Brit Awards

!
|-
|2009
|"Dance wiv Me" (with Dizzee Rascal and Chrome)
|British Single of the Year
|
|
|-
|2010
|rowspan="2"|Calvin Harris
|rowspan="2"|British Male Solo Artist
|
|
|-
|2013
|
|
|-
|rowspan="2"|2014
|rowspan="2"|"I Need Your Love" (featuring Ellie Goulding)
|British Single of the Year
|
|rowspan="2"|
|-
|British Video of the Year
|
|-
|rowspan="2"|2015
|rowspan="2"|"Summer"
|British Single of the Year
|
|rowspan="2"|
|-
|British Video of the Year
|
|-
|rowspan="3"|2016
|Calvin Harris
|British Male Solo Artist
|
|rowspan="3"|
|-
|rowspan="2"|"How Deep Is Your Love" (with Disciples)
|British Single of the Year
|
|-
|British Video of the Year
|
|-
|rowspan="2"|2017
|rowspan="2"|"This Is What You Came For" (featuring Rihanna)
|British Single of the Year
|
|rowspan="2"|
|-
|British Video of the Year
|
|-
|rowspan="2"|2018
|rowspan="2"|"Feels" (featuring Pharrell Williams, Katy Perry and Big Sean)
|British Single of the Year
|
|rowspan="2"|
|-
|British Video of the Year
|
|-
|rowspan="3"|2019
|rowspan="1"|Calvin Harris
|Producer of the Year
|
|rowspan="3"|
|-
|rowspan="2"|"One Kiss" (with Dua Lipa)
|British Single of the Year
|
|-
|British Video of the Year
|
|-
|2020
|"Giant" (with Rag'n'Bone Man)
|Song of the Year
|
|
|-
|2023
|Calvin Harris
|British Dance Act
|
|

Danish Music Awards 

|-
| rowspan="1" |2012
| "We Found Love" (featuring Rihanna)
| International Hit of the Year
|  
|-
|2017
| "Funk Wav Bounces Vol. 1" 
| International Album of the Year
|  
|-

DJ Magazine top 100 DJs

Electronic Music Awards & Foundation Show

|-
| rowspan="2" |2016
| "How Deep is Your Love" (featuring Disciples)
| Single of the Year
|  
|-
| Motion
| Album of the Year
|  
|-

Fonogram Awards
Fonogram Awards is the national music awards of Hungary, held every year since 1992 and promoted by Mahasz.

|-
| rowspan="1" |2018
| "Funk Wav Bounces Vol.1" 
|  Foreign Electronic Music Album or Voice Recording
|  
|-

Grammy Awards

!
|-
|rowspan="2"|2013
|"We Found Love" (with Rihanna)
|Best Music Video
|
|rowspan="2"|
|-
|"Let's Go" (featuring Ne-Yo)
|rowspan="2"|Best Dance Recording
| 
|-
|rowspan="2"|2014
|"Sweet Nothing" (featuring Florence Welch)
|
|rowspan="2"|
|-
|18 Months
|Best Dance/Electronic Album
|
|-
|2018
|Calvin Harris
|Producer of the Year, Non-Classical
|
|

Global Awards

|-
|rowspan="4"|2019
|"One Kiss" (with Dua Lipa)
|rowspan="2"|Best Song 
|
|-
|"Promises" (with Sam Smith)
|
|-
|rowspan="2"|Calvin Harris
|Best Male
|
|-
|Best British Artist or Group
|
|-

Hungarian Music Awards
The Hungarian Music Awards is the national music awards of Hungary, held every year since 1992 and promoted by Mahasz.

|-
| 2010
| Ready for the Weekend
| Dance-Pop Album of the Year 
| 
|-
| 2013
| Calvin Harris
| Foreign Electronic Music Production of the Year 
| 
|-
| 2014
| "Under Control" (with Alesso and Hurts)
| rowspan=4|Foreign Electronic Music Album or Voice Recording 
| 
|-
| rowspan=2|2015
| Motion
| 
|-
| "My Way"
| 
|-
| 2018
| Funk Wav Bounces Vol. 1
|

iHeartRadio Music Awards

|-
|2014
|"Sweet Nothing" (featuring Florence Welch)
|EDM Song of the Year
|
|-
|rowspan="2"|2015
|"Blame" (featuring John Newman)
|rowspan="2"|Dance Song of the Year
|
|-
|"Summer"
|
|-
|2016
|rowspan="2"|Calvin Harris
|rowspan="2"|Dance Artist of the Year
|
|-
|rowspan="3"|2017
|
|-
|rowspan="2"|"This Is What You Came For" (featuring Rihanna)
|Best Collaboration
|
|-
|Best Music Video
|
|-
|2018
|rowspan="2"|Calvin Harris
|rowspan="2"|Dance Artist of the Year
|
|-
|rowspan="3"|2019
|
|-
|rowspan="2"|"One Kiss" (featuring Dua Lipa)
|Dance Song of the Year
|
|-
|Best Music Video
|
|}

International Dance Music Awards

|-
|rowspan="2"|2012
|rowspan="2"|"We Found Love" (with Rihanna)
|Best R&B/Urban Dance Track
| 
|-
|Best Commercial/Pop Dance Track
| 
|-
|rowspan="5"|2013
|rowspan="3"|"Sweet Nothing" (featuring Florence Welch)
|Best Progressive Track
|
|-
|Best Music Video
|
|-
|Best Commercial/Pop Dance Track
|
|-
|rowspan="3"|Calvin Harris
|Best Remixer
|
|-
|Best Artist (Solo)
|
|-
|2020
|Best Dance / Electronic (Male)
|
|}

Ivor Novello Awards

|-
|2009
|"Dance wiv Me" (with Dizzee Rascal and Chrome)
|Best Contemporary Song
| 
|-
|2013
|Calvin Harris
|Songwriter of the Year
|
|-
|}

Latin American Music Awards

Los Premios 40 Principales

Los Premios 40 Principales América

|-
|rowspan=2|2012
|rowspan=2|Calvin Harris
|Best International New Act
| rowspan="1" 
|-
|Best International Dance Act
| 
|-
|rowspan=2|2014
|Calvin Harris
|Best English Language Act
|
|-
|"Summer"
|Best English Language Song
|

LOS40 Music Awards

|-
|rowspan=1|2017
|"Funk Wav Bounces Vol. 1"
|International Album of the Year
|
|-
|rowspan=1|2018
| "One Kiss" 
|International Song of the Year
|
|-

MTV Awards

MTV Europe Music Awards

|-
|rowspan="3"|2012
|Best Song
|rowspan="2"|"We Found Love" (with Rihanna)
|
|-
|Best Video
|
|-
|Best Electronic Act
|rowspan="12"|Calvin Harris
|
|-
|rowspan="2"|2013
|Best Electronic Act
|
|-
|Best UK & Ireland Act
|
|-
|rowspan="2"|2014
|Best Electronic Act
|
|-
|Best UK & Ireland Act
|
|-
|rowspan="2"|2015
|Best Electronic Act
|
|-
|Best UK & Ireland Act
|
|-
|rowspan="2"|2016
|Best Male Act
|
|-
|rowspan="4"|Best Electronic Act
|
|-
| 2017
|
|-
|2018
|
|-
|2019
|

MTV Video Music Awards

|-
|rowspan="4"|2012
| Video of the Year
| rowspan="3"|"We Found Love" (with Rihanna)
| 
|-
| Best Female Video
| 
|-
| Best Pop
| 
|-
||Best Electronic Video
|"Feel So Close"
|
|-
|rowspan="3"|2013
|Best Collaboration
|rowspan="2"|"I Need Your Love" (featuring Ellie Goulding)
|
|-
|Best Song of the Summer
|
|-
|Best Editing
|"Sweet Nothing"
|
|-
|2014
|Best Dance Video
|"Summer"
|
|-
|rowspan="3"|2016
|Best Male Video
|rowspan="2"|"This Is What You Came For" (featuring Rihanna)
| 
|-
|Best Collaboration
| 
|-
|Best Electronic Video
|"How Deep Is Your Love" (with Disciples)
| 
|-
|rowspan="2"|2017
|Best Collaboration
|"Feels" (with Katy Perry, Pharrell Williams & Big Sean)
| 
|-
|Best Dance Video
|"My Way"
| 
|-
|rowspan="2"|2018
|Best Dance
|rowspan="2"|"One Kiss" (with Dua Lipa)
| 
|-
|Song of Summer
| 
|-

MTV Video Music Awards Japan

|-
|2012
|"We Found Love" (with Rihanna)
|Best Pop
| 
|-
|2013
|rowspan="1"|"Sweet Nothing" (featuring Florence Welch)
|Best Collaboration
|
|-

MuchMusic Video Awards

|-
|2012
|rowspan="1"|"We Found Love" (with Rihanna)
|International Video of the Year – Artist
| 
|-
|2018
|rowspan="1"|Calvin Harris
|Best EDM/Dance Artist or Group
| 
|-

NME Awards

|-
|2009
|"Dance wiv Me" (with Dizzee Rascal and Chrome)
|Best Dancefloor Filler
|
|-
|2013
|"Sweet Nothing" (featuring Florence Welch)
|Dancefloor Anthem
| rowspan="1" 
|-

NRJ Music Award

|-
|2009
|"We Found Love" 
|Best Song International
|
|-
| rowspan="2" |2016
| rowspan="3" |Calvin Harris
|Best Live Performance
|
|-
|Best International DJ
|
|-
| rowspan="3" |2018
|DJ of the Year
|
|-
| rowspan="2" |"One Kiss" 
| International Duo/Group of the year
|
|-
|International Song of the Year
|
|-

WDM Radio Awards

|-
|rowspan="2"|2017
|rowspan="1"|Calvin Harris
|rowspan="1"|King of Social Media
|
|-
|rowspan="1"|"This Is What You Came For" (featuring Rihanna)
|rowspan="1"|Best Global Track
|
|-
|rowspan="1"|2018
|rowspan="1"|Calvin Harris
|rowspan="1"|King of Social Media
|
|-
|}

YouTube Creator Awards
Calvin Harris   (18.5 million subscribers - July 2022)

Other awards

References 

Harris, Calvin
Awards